Puruogangri is an ice sheet in the Tibetan Plateau, in Nagqu, China. It is shrinking rapidly.

Location

Puruogangri was discovered by Chinese and American scientists around 1999.
It has been confirmed to be the third largest ice field in the world.
The other two are in the Arctic and the Antarctic.
Puruogangri is in the Nagqu prefecture-level city of Tibet, China.
It is in a harsh mountain environment that is not accessible to tourists.

The ice field is the largest in the North of the Tibetan Plateau.
The ice sheet is radial, with over 50 tongues of ice of different lengths that extend from the ice sheet through wide and shallow valleys.
In the areas with lower tongues there are many ice pyramids.

Climate

Puruogangri is near the boundary between the southern part of the Tibetan Plateau, where the weather is driven by the monsoon cycle, and the northern part where it is driven by continental westerly storms coming from the Arctic and the North Atlantic.
The latter process has the greatest effect on the ice field.
The Tibetan Plateau and Himalaya hold the largest amount of ice outside the Arctic and Antarctic.
Meltwater from the glaciers feeds the Yangtze, Yellow, Indus, Brahmaputra and Ganges rivers.
The glaciers have been shrinking since the Little Ice Age.

Shrinkage

Ice cores were recovered from the Puruogangri ice field in 2000, filling a gap in knowledge of climate change in the Central Tibetan Plateau.
The upper  covered the last 1,000 years, and was analyzed along its length for the δ18O oxygen isotope ratio.
The results, correlated and checked against ice cores from other locations, showed a sharp increase in temperature starting in the late 19th century.
The rate of shrinkage is expected to accelerate, with 2/3 of China's glaciers gone by 2060.

Notes

Sources

Glaciers of China
Glaciers of Tibet
Nagqu
Ice sheets